Jennifer Croxton (born 1944 in Cambridge) is a British actress.

Career
Croxton guest-starred as Lady Diana Forbes-Blakeney opposite Patrick Macnee in the 1969 episode of The Avengers, "Killers", a role which remains one of her most well-known. She appeared in the film, Our Miss Fred (1972), opposite Danny La Rue, and other television credits include It's Awfully Bad For Your Eyes, Darling, Anne of Avonlea, and The Lady and the Highwayman. She played Plautia Urgulanilla in I, Claudius, and has appeared in The Cleopatras, The Agatha Christie Hour and The Stanley Baxter Show.

In 1993 Croxton portrayed Wallis Simpson in Paul Webb's play, A Dangerous Woman, at the Jermyn Street Theatre, London.

She is a member of the BAFTA academy.

References

External links 

The Avengers website
Jennifer Croxton's Filmography at the BFI

Living people
British film actresses
People from Cambridge
British television actresses
1944 births